Hopeite is a hydrated zinc phosphate with formula: Zn3(PO4)2·4H2O. It is a rare mineral used mainly as a collectors specimen.

Hopeite crystallizes in the orthorhombic system with prismatic, vitreous white to yellow crystals. It also forms druzy encrustations and reniform (kidney-shaped) masses.   The related mineral parahopeite, which has the same composition but different crystal structure, is triclinic.  The minerals are formed through oxidation of sphalerite by the presence of phosphate-rich solutions

It was first described in 1822 from Moresnet, Liège Province, Belgium and is named after Scottish chemist, Thomas Charles Hope (1766–1844) of the University of Edinburgh.

It has been found in Zambia associated with lazulite.

Hopeite is one of the 2 conversion minerals arising from the application of the rust converter 'Fertan'.

References

 Mindat with location data
 Mineral galleries
 Webmineral data

Phosphate minerals
Zinc minerals
Orthorhombic minerals
Minerals in space group 62
Minerals described in 1822